Major General Charles Hunter Gerhardt (June 6, 1895 – October 9, 1976) was a senior United States Army officer who fought in both World War I and World War II. During the latter, he commanded the 29th Infantry Division from 1943 until the end of the war and during part of the occupation of Germany. The division's most famous combat operations were the Omaha Beach landings of June 6, 1944 (his 49th birthday), otherwise known as D-Day, and the taking of the French crossroads town of Saint-Lô in July 1944.

Early life and military career

Gerhardt grew up in the army as the son of Charles Gerhardt, a career officer who retired as a brigadier general. The younger Gerhardt attended the United States Military Academy (USMA) at West Point, New York in 1913, where he earned a reputation as a skilled football, baseball and polo player. In 1916, Gerhardt quarterbacked for West Point to a 30-10 upset win over Notre Dame, which was led by the famed freshman George Gipp. It was Notre Dame's only loss that year.

Gerhardt's West Point class graduated on April 6, 1917, the day America officially declared war. Graduation was six weeks earlier than intended because of the U.S. entry into the war. Subsequently, Gerhardt was commissioned as a second lieutenant into the Cavalry Branch of the United States Army. Among those he graduated alongside were men such as Matthew Ridgway, Mark W. Clark, J. Lawton Collins, Ernest N. Harmon, Norman Cota, William W. Eagles, Laurence B. Keiser, Frederick Augustus Irving, John T. Cole, Augustus M. Gurney, Elbert L. Ford, John M. Devine, Charles S. Kilburn, Harold R. Jackson, Basil H. Perry, Albert C. Smith, Clare Hibbs Armstrong, Daniel Noce, Aaron Bradshaw Jr. Harris M. Melasky, William C. McMahon and William Kelly Harrison, Jr., all of whom would, like Gerhardt, later become general officers, with Ridgway and Collins in particular becoming U.S. Army Chief of Staff.

His first posting upon his graduation was with a cavalry unit in Texas. However, he later served as a staff officer with the headquarters of the 89th Division on the Western Front as part of the American Expeditionary Force (AEF). He ended the war as aide-de-camp to Major General William M. Wright, commander of the 89th Division.

Between the wars
Remaining in the army during the interwar period, in 1932, Gerhardt was selected as a judge in the equestrian events for the 1932 Olympic Games held in Los Angeles. At some point, he attended the  United States Army Command and General Staff College. On July 1, 1940 he was promoted to lieutenant colonel.

World War II

By the time of the Japanese attack on Pearl Harbor and the subsequent American entry into World War II, Gerhardt was in command of the 56th Cavalry Brigade, having been in command since September 13 after receiving a promotion to the temporary rank of brigadier general on July 10, 1941.

He was again promoted, now to the two-star rank of major general, on June 26, 1942, eight months after Pearl Harbor, he was the first Commanding General (CG) of the 91st Infantry Division, an all draftee division, at Camp White, Oregon.

In July 1943, taking over from Major General Leonard T. Gerow, he assumed command of the 29th Infantry Division, a National Guard formation which was then stationed in South West England in preparation for the Allied invasion of Normandy and had been there since October 1942. In preparation for the invasion, scheduled for the spring of 1944, the division trained extensively in amphibious operations.

Major General Gerhardt was a hard taskmaster, a strict disciplinarian and considered by many of his men to be a martinet, who often became upset at small things such as a soldier not having the chinstrap of his helmet buckled. One famous story has him admonishing a soldier on the day after D-Day for dropping peels from the orange he was eating on the ground. He was intolerant of any dirt or mud being on the trucks, and would make soldiers stop and clean a truck under almost any circumstance. Major General Gerhardt was, however, a superb and driven trainer of soldiers and expected the same from his subordinates. He led the 29th Infantry Division throughout the fighting in Western Europe, from D-Day (June 6, 1944) until the end of World War II in Europe on Victory in Europe Day (May 8, 1945).

Gerhardt was one of the European Theater's more controversial commanders. His critics held that he was lacking as a military tactician and careless with the lives of his men; often pointing to the astonishingly high casualty rate of the 29th Division, which, from June 6, 1944 to May 8, 1945, suffered over 20,600 men killed, wounded or missing. It was said that Gerhardt actually commanded three divisions: one on the field of battle, one in the hospital and one in the cemetery. He was also considered somewhat loose morally, as evidenced by a house of prostitution he established for his men near Rennes, France, which Lieutenant General Omar Bradley, the U.S. 12th Army Group commander, did not approve of and ordered closed. It was only open for five hours. Gerhardt personally approved the sign, which read, "Blue and Gray Corral; Riding Lessons 100 Francs." Blue and Gray was the nickname of the division which consisted of men from both sides of the Mason-Dixon Line. Gerhardt usually walked the line between approval and disapproval with his superior officers. After the war, he was demoted to colonel for reasons thought to be a combination of the 29th Division's high casualty rate and his moral lapses.

Postwar
Following the war Gerhardt served as the United States Defense Attaché to Brazil and in a post at Fort Meade, Maryland.  He reattained the rank of brigadier general and was able to retire at his highest held rank of major general.

He died on October 9, 1976 at the age of 81 and is buried at Arlington National Cemetery.

Awards
His awards include:
 Army Distinguished Service Medal
 Silver Star
 Legion of Merit
 Bronze Star (2)

See also
 The Major of St. Lo

References

Bibliography
 Beyond the Beachhead: The 29th Division in Normandy, by Joseph Balkoski
 29 Let's Go! A History of the 29th Infantry Division in World War II, by Joseph Ewing

External links
Memoirs of Charles H. Gerhardt, Dwight D. Eisenhower Presidential Library 
29th Division order of battle at Omaha Beach
Booklet of the 29th Infantry Division
Generals of World War II

|-

1895 births
1976 deaths
United States Army Cavalry Branch personnel
United States Army personnel of World War I
United States Army generals of World War II
United States Army generals
United States Military Academy alumni
United States Army Command and General Staff College alumni
Burials at Arlington National Cemetery
Recipients of the Distinguished Service Medal (US Army)
Recipients of the Silver Star
Recipients of the Legion of Merit
Military personnel from Tennessee
People from Lebanon, Tennessee